The Condemned is a 2007 action film written and directed by Scott Wiper. The film stars Steve Austin, Vinnie Jones, Robert Mammone, Tory Mussett, Madeleine West and Rick Hoffman.

The film centers on ten convicts who are forced to fight each other to the death as part of an illegal game which is being broadcast to the public.  The Condemned was filmed in Queensland, Australia. Fight choreography was coordinated by Richard Norton, who also stunt doubles for Jones on some scenes. A sequel titled The Condemned 2 starring Randy Orton was released in 2015.

The film was produced by WWE Films and distributed by Lionsgate on April 27, 2007.

Plot 
Jack Conrad awaits execution in a corrupt Salvadoran prison. He is "purchased" by a wealthy television producer and transported to a deserted island in the South Pacific along with nine other condemned criminals from prisons around the world.  They are "offered" the opportunity to avoid capital punishment and win back their freedom with a pocket full of cash by fighting to the death in an illegal game to be filmed and broadcast live over the Internet.

A bomb is placed on the ankle of every contestant, each featuring a 30-hour countdown timer, and a pin (similar to a grenade) that will detonate the bomb after a ten-second delay. The winner will have the bomb removed and be given their freedom as well as a pocket full of cash as the prize. Ian Breckel, the producer, is aiming for online ratings that equal or beat the latest Super Bowl reception of 40 million television viewers.

As the broadcast progresses, FBI agents discover Conrad's real identity as Jack Riley after a tip from one of Conrad's former classmates. Conrad is discovered to be a former Delta Force operative who was captured on a Black ops mission to El Salvador after bombing a building controlled by drug dealers. Conrad's girlfriend Sarah becomes aware of the situation and watches the show at the local bar she works at as it unfolds.

Ewan McStarley and Saiga team up to remove the competition, while Yasantwa uses her wiles to trick others to their death. After seeing the show's broadcast tower before the show, Conrad infiltrates the tower and calls Sarah, managing to tell her the latitude of the island before he is forced to leave.

After the other seven contestants have died, Conrad is left alone against McStarley and Saiga. He stabs Saiga, and McStarley flees. Eventually, a helicopter drops a shotgun down to McStarley, who uses it to hunt down Conrad. After Conrad falls into a stream, McStarley runs into the cameraman and his armed guard dressed in ghillie suits while searching for Conrad, and shoots them, picking up the guard's MP5 submachine gun.

When McStarley and Conrad meet again, Conrad ends up rolling over a cliff and into a stream to avoid being shot by McStarley's shotgun. Conrad is presumed dead by the fall, and McStarley is declared the winner. As McStarley is being driven to the control tower to collect his prize, Breckel hears that the FBI has sent United States Navy SEALs to take him into custody. After he meets McStarley and de-activates his bomb, he tells him that he will not receive his prize money as it is revealed that Breckel has fixed the game in McStarley’s favor. McStarley takes an MP5 from one of the guards, and kills the tech team in the building, one by one, even though they truthfully did not know that Breckel was abandoning them all. When he corners Julie, Breckel's girlfriend, he is confronted by Conrad, who shoots him several times after talking briefly about McStarley's past. Conrad grabs McStarley's two machine guns and chases down Breckel, who is fleeing the island in a helicopter. After emptying the two guns firing at the helicopter, he is given McStarley's re-activated ankle bomb by Julie. Conrad throws it into the helicopter, and Breckel reaches for it; however, the helicopter explodes, and crashes into a cliff, killing Breckel and bringing his vicious game to an end.

Conrad is driven back to Sarah's home in Texas, a free man. Sarah, who presumed him dead after he fell off the cliff in his struggle against McStarley, greets him.

Cast
 Steve Austin as Jack Conrad / Jack Riley
 Vinnie Jones as Ewan McStarley
 Manu Bennett as Paco Pacheco
 Nathan Jones as Petr Raudsep
 Masa Yamaguchi as Go Saiga
 Emelia Burns as Yasantwa Adei
 Marcus Johnson as Kreston Mackie
 Dasi Ruz as Rosa Pacheco
 Andy McPhee as Helmut Bruggerman
 Rai Fazio as Dominic Giangrasso
 Rick Hoffman as Goldman
 Robert Mammone as Ian "Breck" Breckel
 Tory Mussett as Julie
 Sam Healy as Bella
 Madeleine West as Sarah Cavanaugh
 Sullivan Stapleton as Brad Wilkins
 Luke Pegler as Baxter
 Angie Milliken as Donna Sereno

Soundtrack 

The Condemned (Original Motion Picture Soundtrack) was released on April 24, 2007. It was composed by Graeme Revell. It is exclusively available on the iTunes Store.

 Additional tracks
Other songs featured in the film, but not included on the soundtrack:
 "You Don't Know" by Eminem, 50 Cent, Lloyd Banks & Cashis
 "Lonely Train" by Black Stone Cherry
 "In the Air Tonight" by Phil Collins
 "Out of Line" by Buckcherry
 "Backwoods Gold" by Black Stone Cherry
 "Driven" by Sevendust
 "Bullet with a Name" by Nonpoint
 "Shooting Star" by Black Stone Cherry
 "Soulcrusher" by Operator
 "Firestarter" by The Prodigy
 "Savin' Me" by Nickelback

Release

Critical response 
As of April, 2020, Rotten Tomatoes listed the film with a 15% rating, based on 101 reviews. The site's consensus stated: "The Condemned is a morally ambiguous, exceedingly violent and mostly forgettable action film." As of April, 2020, Metacritic gave the film a score of 23 Out of 100, indicating "generally unfavorable reviews". Reviews of The Condemned included complaints of plot holes, overly preachy tone, lack of plot progression, hypocritical morals, poor fight choreography and one "fake" wrestler.

V.A. Musetto of the New York Post gave the film zero stars out of four, describing it as a "sickeningly violent and inane movie" and complaining that it is a bad rip-off of Battle Royale and The Most Dangerous Game.

One of the few positive reviews came from Michael Booth of The Denver Post. He described the concept as "The Truman Show meets Con Air" and makes positive notes about the reality television aspects of the story, although he cautions readers not to expect "high art" based on the 3 star rating he gives the film.

Box office 
The film debuted with a $3.8 million opening weekend in the US. The film lasted only 4 weeks in theaters and posted a big loss, closing with a total of $7,371,706. The movie fared worse internationally, taking only $1,271,152 in limited foreign markets, for a total of $8,642,858.

Home media

On September 18, 2007, The Condemned was released on DVD and Blu-ray. Opening at number four, The Condemned brought in $6.5 million in the first week. Overall, it has sold an estimated 1.185 million DVD units earning $22.7 million. The DVD made its release in the United Kingdom on March 24, 2008 with a rating of 18 (Contains Strong Violence and Language). This was a straight to DVD release in the United Kingdom.

Sequel
A sequel titled The Condemned 2 starring Randy Orton was released on November 6, 2015.

References

External links

The Condemned at WWE.com

2000s chase films
2000s dystopian films
2007 films
2007 action thriller films
Australian action thriller films
American action thriller films
American chase films
American dystopian films
Fiction about death games
2000s English-language films
Films about death games
Films about snuff films
Films scored by Graeme Revell
Films shot at Village Roadshow Studios
Films set in the Pacific Ocean
Films set on uninhabited islands
Films shot in Queensland
Films with screenplays by Rob Hedden
Lionsgate films
WWE Studios films
2000s American films